Emden is an independent city and seaport in Lower Saxony in the northwest of Germany, on the river Ems. It is the main city of the region of East Frisia and, in 2011, had a total population of 51,528.

History

The exact founding date of Emden is unknown, but it has existed at least since the 8th century. Older names for Emden are Setutanda, Amuthon, Embda, Emda, Embden and Embderland. Town privilege and the town's coat of arms, the Engelke up de Muer (The Little Angel on the Wall) was granted by Emperor Maximilian I in 1495. 

In the 16th century, Emden briefly became an important centre for the Protestant Reformation under the rule of Countess Anna von Oldenburg who was determined to find a religious "third way" between Lutheranism and Catholicism. In 1542 she invited the Polish noble John Laski (or Johannes a Lasco) to become pastor of a Protestant church at Emden; and for 7 years he continued to spread the new religion around the area of East Frisia. However, in 1549 following pressure from the Emperor Charles V, the Countess was forced to ask Laski to leave for England and the experiment came to an end. Nevertheless, the legacy was important for the reformation in the Netherlands. 

At the end of the 16th century, Emden experienced a period of great prosperity. Due to the Spanish blockade of Flemish and Brabant ports at the start of the Dutch Revolt, Emden became the most important transshipment port on the North Sea. Thousands of Protestant refugees came from Flanders and the Duchy of Brabant to the Protestant city Emden to escape persecution by the Spanish rulers of the Low Countries. During this period, the predominantly Calvinist Emden came into conflict with the Lutheran counts of East Friesland. 

The Emden Revolution in 1595 resulted in Emden becoming a distinct city-state.  With the support of the Dutch Republic, Emden became a free government city under the protection of the Dutch Republic. The Brabantian dialect became the official language of trade and civil administration. Emden was a very rich city during the 17th century, due to large numbers of Dutch and Flemish immigrants such as Diederik Jansz. Graeff. It was a centre of reformed Protestantism at that time.  The political theorist Johannes Althusius served as Syndic from 1604 to 1638. 

In 1744, Emden was annexed by Prussia. In 1752 Frederick the Great chartered the Emden Company to trade with Canton, but the company was ruined when Emden was captured by French forces in 1757 during the Seven Years' War. The city was recaptured by Anglo-German forces in 1758 and for the rest of the conflict was used as a major supply base by the British to support the ongoing war in Westphalia. During the Napoleonic Wars, Emden and the surrounding lands of East Frisia were part of the short-lived Kingdom of Holland. Industrialization started at around 1870, with a paper mill and a somewhat bigger shipyard. At the end of the 19th century, a big canal, the Dortmund-Ems Canal was constructed, which connected Emden with the Ruhr area. This made Emden the "seaport of the Ruhr area", which lasted until the 1970s. Coal from the south was transported to the North Sea port, and imported iron ore was shipped via the canal towards Rhine and the Ruhr. The last iron ore freighter was moored in the port of Emden in 1986. 

In 1903, a large shipyard (Nordseewerke, "North Sea Works") was founded and was in operation until 2010. During World War II, Emden was repeatedly targeted by Allied bombing raids, which destroyed the majority of the city center. The Royal Air Force (RAF) launched its first bombing raid over Emden in 31 March 1940, and both the RAF and the United States Army Air Forces (USAAF) continued to launch raids against the city for the duration of the war. On 6 September 1944, the RAF and USAAF launched their largest bombing raid against Emden, which destroyed approximately 80% of all structures in the city center. However, the Emden shipyards, in contrast to the rest of the city, was left largely unaffected by the bombing raids. After the war, Emden came under Allied occupation and rebuilding efforts commenced. On 6 September 1962, exactly 18 years after the 1944 raid, the current Emden city hall was officially opened.

Climate

Economy
The main industries in Emden are automobile production and shipbuilding. Volkswagen runs a large production plant which builds the Volkswagen Passat car and which employs around 10,000 people. Emden harbor is also one of the three main ports for car shipping in Europe (together with Zeebrugge in Belgium and Bremerhaven in Germany). More than 1.4 million cars were imported and exported in 2017. The Nordseewerke shipyard, a subsidiary of ThyssenKrupp, employs around 1,400 dockers and specializes in conventional submarines. It also produces different kinds of cargo ships as well as ships for special purposes such as icebreakers, dredgers and other ships of that type.

Another important economic sector is tourism, mainly as a day trip destination for tourists staying in the surrounding villages on the North Sea coastline.

A university of applied sciences (Fachhochschule) was opened in 1973. At present, around 4,240 students are enrolled, most of them studying for technical degrees.

The airline Ostfriesische Lufttransport had its headquarters in Emden.

Sports
The highest playing association football club is BSV Kickers Emden. The capacity of the stadium is 7,200, due to safety objections of the German Football Association. In 1994, some 12,000 spectators followed a match against the reserves squad of Hamburger SV, which remains the record. In that season, Kickers Emden finished top of the 3rd League, but were not promoted to the Second League as they lost the promotion round.

Since Emden is not only located close to the North Sea, but also to the river Ems and various small rivers and canals, boat sports are very popular among inhabitants and tourists.

Notable people

 Johann van Lingen (1425–1481), Mayor of Emden
 Jacob Emden, also known as Ya'avetz (1697–1776), leading German rabbi and talmudist
 Pieter Dirkszoon Keyser (c. 1540–1596), sailor in Portuguese and Dutch service
 Johannes Althusius (1563–1638), legal scholar, Calvinist political theorist, city counsel and politician
 Johann Heinrich Alting (1583–1644), reformed theologian
 Martin Hermann Faber (1586–1648), painter, architect, and cartographer
 Ludolf Bakhuizen (1630–1708), major Marinemaler
 Eduard Norden (1868–1941), philologist and religious historian
 Claude France (1893–1928), actor
 Hans Boelsen (1894–1960), general lieutenant in the Second World War
 Henri Nannen (1913–1996), publisher and publicist, founder of Stern magazine
 Hans-Joachim Hespos (1938–2022), composer
 Helma Sanders-Brahms (1940–2014), film director and actress
 Karl Dall (1941–2020), presenter, singer and comedian
 Wolfgang Petersen (1941–2022), film director and producer
 Alwin Brinkmann (born 1946), Mayor of Emden
 Otto Waalkes (born 1948), comedian, comic artist, singer and actor
 Eva Herman (born 1958), book author and former television presenter
 Jan van Koningsveld (born 1969), mental calculator
 Heidi Hartmann (born 1971), boxing champion
 Stefan Lampadius (born 1976), actor and filmmaker
 Ferydoon Zandi (born 1979), football player

Ships and places named after the city

Three German light cruisers were named after the city, two of which served in World War I and the third in World War II. Today, the fifth navy ship named after the city is in service.

 SMS Emden (1906), a light cruiser in the Kaiserliche Marine, Bay of Bengal, Battle of Cocos
 Emden (1911), schooner, renamed Duhnen, then Brigantine Yankee; made four circumnavigations
 SMS Emden (1916), a light cruiser in the Kaiserliche Marine
 Emden (1925), a light cruiser in the Kriegsmarine, used in the invasion of Norway and Denmark
 F210 Emden (1979), Bremen-class frigate of the German Navy

A deep sea spot in the Pacific Ocean close to the Philippines is named after the first  ship, and is therefore called Emdentief in German. The spot ( deep) was sounded in the 1920s (in 1920, 1923 or 1928—sources vary).

In addition, the village of Emden, Illinois in the United States was named after Jacob Emden due to the large number of emigrants from Emden to the village in northwestern Logan County, Illinois. Other places in the U.S. named after the city include Emden, Missouri; Embden, Maine; and Embden, North Dakota.

Twin towns – sister cities

Emden is twinned with:
 Arkhangelsk, Russia
 Haugesund, Norway

References

External links

  
 Kunsthalle Emden 
 Johannes a Lasco Library 
 Kickers Emden 
 Chess 
 Current weather data and forecast for Emden 
 Cruisers EMDEN, Frigates EMDEN – 5 warships named EMDEN until today 
 "Google map gives German harbour to Netherlands". BBC. 23 February 2011.—BBC article about an error in Google maps
 
 

 
Port cities and towns in Germany
Port cities and towns of the North Sea
Towns and villages in East Frisia

uz:Emden